Zwetschgenkuchen, Pflaumenkuchen, Zwetschgendatschi (southern Bavaria) or Zwetschgenplootz (Franconia) is a sheet cake or pie made from yeast dough or shortcrust dough that is thinly spread onto a baking sheet or other baking mold and covered with pitted zwetschgen plums.
It is popular as a summer cake and has different local labelings throughout Germany, Austria and Switzerland.

In Hessen, Rhineland-Palatinate, Saarland and Moselle it is known as Quetschekuche, in Bavaria, Baden-Württemberg and parts of Austria it is called Zwetschgendatschi and in Rhineland and the Eifel Prummetaat.
"Datschi" is thought to be derived from the dialect word "detschen" or "datschen" that can be translated as "pinching" (as the plums are pinched into the dough). Made with shortcrust pastry, it is common to serve it with Streusel (a crumbly mixture of butter, sugar and flour) although the original recipe serves it plain without any toppings.

There are claims that the cake was invented in Augsburg where it is considered the city's signature dish. It is said that it resembles the "Zirbelnuss", the city's coat of arms, and from this association Augsburg is also nicknamed "Datschiburg".

In the Palatinate and Rhenish Hesse it is eaten with potato soup or vegetable soup as a main dish for lunch. In contrast the people in Saarland eat it with bean soup and call this dish "Bibbelschesbohnesup un Quetschekuche".

See also
 German cuisine
 Austrian cuisine
 Cake
 List of German desserts

References
Article in German

Bavarian cuisine
Austrian confectionery
German confectionery
Cakes
German cakes
German pies
Plum dishes